The Scripps Howard Awards, formerly the National Journalism Awards are $10,000 awards in American journalism given by the Scripps Howard Foundation.

As of 2022, the categories are:

 Excellence in Coverage of Breaking News
 Excellence in Broadcast Local Coverage, honoring Jack R. Howard
 Excellence in Broadcast National/International Coverage, honoring Jack R. Howard
 Excellence in Business/Financial Reporting:
 Excellence in Environmental Reporting, honoring Edward W. “Ted” Scripps II
 Distinguished Service to the First Amendment, honoring Edward Willis Scripps
 Excellence in Human Interest Storytelling, honoring Ernie Pyle
 Excellence in Innovation, honoring Roy W. Howard
 Excellence in Local/Regional Investigative Reporting
 Excellence in National/International Investigative Reporting, the Ursula and Gilbert Farfel Prize
 Excellence in Multimedia Journalism
 Excellence in Opinion Writing
 Excellence in Radio/Podcast Coverage, honoring Jack R. Howard
 Excellence in Visual Journalism
 Impact Award
 Teacher of the Year
 Administrator of the Year

List of awardees

References

External links 
 Scripps Howard Awards

American journalism awards
Awards established in 1953
E. W. Scripps Company